Hamilton North may refer to one of two places:
Hamilton North, New South Wales, a suburb of Newcastle, New South Wales, Australia
Hamilton North, New Zealand, one of the suburbs of Hamilton, New Zealand
Hamilton North and East (ward), electoral ward in Scotland